Urban Luzon is the term used for the cities in Southern Luzon.

TV ratings agency AGB Nielsen Philippines considers Urban Luzon and the provinces of Bulacan, Cavite, Laguna and Rizal as their area of responsibility for their TV audience ratings gathering.  The area has a higher ownership of televisions per household anywhere in the country due to its relative economic prosperity as compared to other places in the Philippines.  Radio ratings agency Radio Research Council (provided by KBP) also provide measurement of audience ratings.

See also
 Greater Manila Area
 Mega Manila, term used in advertising to denote similar geographic concentration of wealth in the Philippines.
 Metro Baguio
 Metro Naga
 Lingayen-Lucena corridor, an elections equivalent
 Solid North, part of Luzon dominated by the Ilocano people that voted solidly for Ferdinand Marcos and his family.

Television in the Philippines
Luzon